"The Way I Rock My Clothes" is a single released by Hip-hop artist/Producer Funkghost. The song was released February 17, 2009 on Grand Extravagant Ent. The music video for "The Way I Rock My Clothes" was shot and released in late February 2009 to positive reviews.  The song was produced by Symbolyc One of Strange Fruit Project. "The Way I Rock My Clothes" has been well received by critics and has since garnered mixshow airplay on FM stations across The United States.

Track listing

References

2009 singles
2009 songs